The 1976 Wake Forest Demon Deacons football team was an American football team that represented Wake Forest University during the 1976 NCAA Division I football season. In their fourth season under head coach Chuck Mills, the Demon Deacons compiled a 5–6 record and finished in third place in the Atlantic Coast Conference.

Schedule

Team leaders

References

Wake Forest
Wake Forest Demon Deacons football seasons
Wake Forest Demon Deacons football